Amblypodia narada is a species of butterfly belonging to the lycaenid family described by Thomas Horsfield in 1828. It is found in Southeast Asia (Java, Borneo, Philippines, Sulawesi, southern Burma, Thailand,  Peninsular Malaya and Sumatra).

Subspecies
Amblypodia narada narada (Java)
Amblypodia narada salvia Fruhstorfer, 1907 (northern Borneo)
Amblypodia narada plateni (Riley, 1922) (Philippines: Mindanao)
Amblypodia narada erichsonii C. & R. Felder, [1865] (Philippines: Luzon)
Amblypodia narada confusa Riley, 1922 (Sulawesi, Banggai)
Amblypodia narada andersonii Moore, 1884 (Mergui)
Amblypodia narada taooana Moore, 1878 (southern Burma, Thailand to Peninsular Malaysia, Langkawi)
Amblypodia narada fara Fruhstorfer, 1907 (Sumatra)
Amblypodia narada smedleyi Riley, [1945] (Siberut)
Amblypodia narada pycnoptera (Toxopeus, 1930) (Nias)
Amblypodia narada sibutuensis Treadaway & Nuyda, 1993 (Philippines: Sibutu)
Amblypodia narada orla Fruhstorfer, 1907 (eastern Java)

References

External links

"Amblypodia Horsfield, [1829]" at Markku Savela's Lepidoptera and Some Other Life Forms. Retrieved June 6, 2017.

Amblypodia
Butterflies described in 1828